The "Te Deum" ( or , ; from its incipit) is a Latin Christian hymn traditionally ascribed to AD 387 authorship, but with antecedents that place it much earlier. It is central to the Ambrosian hymnal, which spread throughout the Latin Church with other parts of the Ambrosian Rite of Milan in the 6th to 8th centuries. It is sometimes known as the Ambrosian Hymn, although authorship by Saint Ambrose is unlikely. The term Te Deum can also refer to a short religious service (of blessing or thanks) based upon the hymn.

History 

Authorship of the hymn is traditionally ascribed to Saint Ambrose (died 397) or Saint Augustine (died 430).
In 19th-century scholarship, Saint Hilary of Poitiers (died 367) and Saint Nicetas of Remesiana (died 414) were proposed as possible authors. In the 20th century, the association with Nicetas has been deprecated, so that the hymn, while almost certainly dating to the 4th century, is considered as being of uncertain authorship. Authorship of Nicetas of Remesiana was suggested by the association of the name "Nicetas" with the hymn in manuscripts from the 10th century onward, and was particularly defended in the 1890s by Germain Morin. Hymnologists of the 20th century, especially Ernst Kähler (1958), have shown the association with "Nicetas" to be spurious. The Te Deum has structural similarities with a eucharistic prayer and it has been proposed that it was originally composed as part of one. 

The hymn was part of the Old Hymnal since it was introduced to the Benedictine order in the 6th century, and it was preserved in the Frankish Hymnal of the 8th century. It was, however, removed from the New Hymnal which became prevalent in the 10th century. It was restored in the 12th century in hymnals that attempted to restore the praiseful intent of the Rule of St. Benedict, Chap. 12: How the Morning Office Is to Be Said.

In the traditional office, the Te Deum is sung at the end of Matins on all days when the Gloria is said at Mass; those days are all Sundays outside Advent, Septuagesima, Lent, and Passiontide; on all feasts (except the Triduum) and on all ferias during Eastertide.

Before the 1961 reforms of Pope John XXIII, neither the Gloria nor the Te Deum were said on the feast of the Holy Innocents, unless it fell on Sunday, as they were martyred before the death of Christ and therefore could not immediately attain the beatific vision. 

In the Liturgy of the Hours of Pope Paul VI, the Te Deum is sung at the end of the Office of Readings on all Sundays except those of Lent, on all solemnities, on the octaves of Easter and Christmas, and on all feasts. A plenary indulgence is granted, under the usual conditions, to those who recite it in public on New Year's Eve.

It is also used together with the standard canticles in Morning Prayer as prescribed in the Anglican Book of Common Prayer, as an option in Morning Prayer or Matins for Lutherans, and is retained by many churches of the Reformed tradition.

The hymn is in regular use in the Catholic Church, Lutheran Church, Anglican Church and Methodist Church (mostly before the Homily) in the Office of Readings found in the Liturgy of the Hours, and in thanksgiving to God for a special blessing such as the election of a pope, the consecration of a bishop, the canonization of a saint, a religious profession, the publication of a treaty of peace, a royal coronation, etc. It is sung either after Mass or the Divine Office or as a separate religious ceremony. The hymn also remains in use in the Anglican Communion and some Lutheran Churches in similar settings.

Text
The petitions at the end of the hymn (beginning Salvum fac populum tuum) are a selection of verses from the book of Psalms, appended subsequently to the original hymn.

The hymn follows the outline of the Apostles' Creed, mixing a poetic vision of the heavenly liturgy with its declaration of faith. Calling on the name of God immediately, the hymn proceeds to name all those who praise and venerate God, from the hierarchy of heavenly creatures to those Christian faithful already in heaven to the Church spread throughout the world.

The hymn then returns to its credal formula, naming Christ and recalling his birth, suffering and death, his resurrection and glorification. At this point the hymn turns to the subjects declaiming the praise, both the universal Church and the singer in particular, asking for mercy on past sins, protection from future sin, and the hoped-for reunification with the elect.

Latin and English text 

In the Book of Common Prayer, verse is written in half-lines, at which reading pauses, indicated by colons in the text.

Service
A Te Deum service is a short religious service, based upon the singing of the hymn, held to give thanks. In Sweden, for example, it may be held in the Royal Chapel in connection with the birth of a prince or princess, christenings, milestone birthdays, jubilees and other important events within the royal family of Sweden. 

In Luxembourg, a service is held annually in the presence of the grand-ducal family to celebrate the Grand Duke's Official Birthday, which is also the nation's national day, on either 23 or 24 June. 

In the Autonomous Region of Madeira, the Bishop of Funchal holds a Te Deum service on December 31 of each year.

It is also celebrated in some South American countries such as Argentina, Chile, and Peru on their national days.

Musical settings

The text has been set to music by many composers, with settings by Zelenka, Handel, Haydn, Mozart, Berlioz, Verdi, Bruckner, Furtwängler, Dvořák, Britten, Kodály, and Pärt among the better known. Jean-Baptiste Lully wrote a setting of Te Deum for the court of Louis XIV of France, and received a fatal injury while conducting it. Michel Richard de Lalande wrote a setting of the Te Deum, S.32. The prelude to Marc-Antoine Charpentier's setting (H.146) is well known in Europe on account of its being used as the theme music for Eurovision network broadcasts of the European Broadcasting Union, most notably the Eurovision Song Contest and Jeux Sans Frontières. He wrote also three other settings of the Te Deum: H.145, H.147, H.148. Henry Desmarets, two settings of Te Deum (1687). Louis-Nicolas Clérambault wrote three settings of the Te Deum: C.135, C.136, C.155. Earlier it had been used as the theme music for Bud Greenspan's documentary series, The Olympiad. Sir William Walton's Coronation Te Deum was written for the coronation of Queen Elizabeth II in 1953. Other English settings include those by Thomas Tallis, William Byrd, Henry Purcell, Edward Elgar, and Herbert Howells, as well as five settings by George Frideric Handel and three settings by Charles Villiers Stanford.

Puccini's opera Tosca features a dramatic performance of the initial part of the Te Deum at the end of Act I.

The traditional chant melody was the basis for elaborate Te Deum compositions by notable French composer organists, Louis Marchand, Guillaume Lasceux, Charles Tournemire (1930), Jean Langlais (1934), and Jeanne Demessieux (1958), which are still widely performed today.

A version by Father Michael Keating is popular in some Charismatic circles. Mark Hayes wrote a setting of the text in 2005, with Latin phrases interpolated amid primarily English lyrics. In 1978, British hymnodist Christopher Idle wrote God We Praise You, a version of the text in 8.7.8.7.D meter, set to the tune Rustington. British composer John Rutter has composed two settings of this hymn, one entitled Te Deum and the other Winchester Te Deum. Igor Stravinsky set the first 12 lines of the text as part of The Flood in 1962. Antony Pitts was commissioned by the London Festival of Contemporary Church Music to write a setting for the 2011 10th Anniversary Festival. The 18th-century German hymn Großer Gott, wir loben dich is a free translation of the Te Deum, which was translated into English in the 19th century as "Holy God, We Praise Thy Name."

Te Deum by Hector Berlioz
Te Deum (1878) by Georges Bizet, for soprano, tenor, mixed choir and orchestra
Te Deum Laudamus, the second part of Symphony No. 1 in D minor ("Gothic") (1919–1927) by Havergal Brian
Two settings by Benjamin Britten: Te Deum in C (1934) and Festival Te Deum (1944)
Te Deum by Anton Bruckner
[[Te Deum (Charpentier)|Te Deum H.145 H.145 a (1670), Te Deum H.146 (1690), Te Deum H.147 (1690), Te Deum H.148 (1698-99)]] by Marc-Antoine Charpentier
 Te Deum from Paris & Te Deum from Lyon by Henri Desmarets
 Te Deum for Great Chorus by Louis-Nicolas ClérambaultTe Deum by Antonín Dvořák Utrecht Te Deum and Jubilate (1713), Dettingen Te Deum (1743) by George Frideric HandelTe Deum by Joseph HaydnShort Festival Te Deum by Gustav HolstTe Deum by Herbert HowellsTe Deum by Johann Hummel
Te Deum by Karl Jenkins
Te Deum by Zoltán Kodály
 Te Deum by Michel-Richard de LalandeTe Deum from Morning Service in E-flat major by John LoretzTe Deum by Jean-Baptiste Lully (1677)Te Deum by James MacMillanTe Deum by Felix MendelssohnTe Deum by Wolfgang Amadeus Mozart 
Te Deum by Arvo PärtTe Deum by Krzysztof PendereckiTe Deum in Giacomo Puccini's Opera ToscaTe Deum by Antoine ReichaTe Deum by John Milford Rutter
Te Deum by Charles Villiers StanfordFestival Te Deum and Te Deum Laudamus by Arthur SullivanTe Deum, the final part of Quattro pezzi sacri by Giuseppe VerdiTe Deum'' by Jan Dismas Zelenka, two settings, ZWV 145 (1724) and ZWV 146 (1731)

References

External links 

 
 Catholic Encyclopedia entry
 

 
4th-century poems
Catholic liturgy
Christian hymns
Christian worship and liturgy
Latin religious words and phrases
Latin-language Christian hymns
Liturgy of the Hours